Wade Dekker is an Australian football (soccer) player who currently plays for the Oakleigh Cannons as a striker.

Club career
On 25 August 2015, Dekker scored his first professional goal in only his 2nd professional game in a 5–1 win over Wellington Phoenix in the FFA Cup. On 10 October 2015 Dekker scored in his first A-League game, away against Sydney FC.

On 28 April 2016, Dekker was released by Melbourne City.

Career statistics

External links 
 
Wade Dekker on Soccer Base

References 

1994 births
Australian soccer players
Association football defenders
National Premier Leagues players
A-League Men players
Melbourne City FC players
Living people
Soccer players from Melbourne